The Asnæs Power Station is a woodchip power plant operated by Ørsted A/S in Kalundborg, Denmark.  It consists of three active units, which deliver 147 MW (Unit 2), 270 MW (Unit 4) and 640 MW (Unit 5). Unit 3 went in service in 1959 and uses a  flue gas stack, while Unit 5, which went into service in 1981, uses a  flue gas stack, the third tallest in Denmark. Its two 60m high coal cranes were dismantled in 2016.

See also 

 List of power stations in Denmark
 Industrial ecology

References

External links 
 Asnæs Power Station (DONG Energy)

Energy infrastructure completed in 1959
Energy infrastructure completed in 1981
Towers completed in 1981
Coal-fired power stations in Denmark
Oil-fired power stations in Denmark
Cogeneration power stations in Denmark
Ørsted (company)
Kalundborg